CSCE may refer to

 China State Construction Engineering
 Coffee, Sugar and Cocoa Exchange which merged to form the New York Board of Trade
 Commission on Security and Cooperation in Europe
 Conference on Security and Co-operation in Europe which preceded the Organization for Security and Co-operation in Europe
 Canadian Society for Civil Engineering
 Certificate of Successful Completion of Examination, used to record results of U.S. amateur radio tests administered by agents of a Volunteer Examiner Coordinator.